Events from the year 1963 in Sweden

Incumbents
 Monarch – Gustaf VI Adolf
 Prime Minister – Tage Erlander

Events

Popular culture

Film
23 September – The Silence released
Ingmar Bergman Makes a Movie, documentary film directed by Vilgot Sjöman

Sport
7 to 13 September – The World Weightlifting Championships were held in Stockholm

Births
 
17 February – Carina Görlin, cross-country skier
12 March – Jerri Bergström, fencer.
1 April – Tobias Svantesson, tennis player
9 April – Magnus Tideman, tennis player
10 April – Jeppe Wikström, book publisher and photographer
11 May – Gunilla Carlsson, politician
26 July – Torgny Mogren, cross-country skier
14 October – Maria Lundqvist, actress
23 April – Pia Cramling, chess grandmaster.
1 September – Idde Schultz, singer and guitarist
31 October – Mikkey Dee, musician
29 December – Ulf Kristersson, politician

Deaths

7 January – Erik Lundqvist, athlete (born 1908).
14 March – Karl-Erik Grahn, football player (born 1914)
14 June – Carl Skottsberg, botanist and Antarctic explorer (born 1880)
25 July – Gösta Stoltz, chess grandmaster (born 1904)

References

 
Sweden
Years of the 20th century in Sweden